José Linhares (28 January 1886 – 26 January 1957) was a Brazilian lawyer who briefly served as the interim president of Brazil in the final months of the Vargas Regime. As President of the Supreme Federal Court, he was called by the Armed Forces to take over the Presidency following the resignation of Getúlio Vargas in 1945, to the inauguration of Eurico Gaspar Dutra, in 1946, which marked the beginning of what is known today as the Fourth Brazilian Republic.

Linhares was appointed Minister of the Supreme Federal Court in 1937, following the retirement of Ataulfo Nápoles de Paiva, and served until his own retirement in 1956. He was twice President of the Supreme Federal Court, from 1945 to 1949, and from 1954 to 1956.

Linhares devoted himself mainly to prepare the return to democratic order, replacing the stakeholders in the states by judiciary members, giving the new parliament constitution-making powers, extinguishing the Court of National Security, abolishing the state of emergency, provided in the 1937 Constitution, among other measures. In the economic and administrative field, acted against inflation, revoked the antitrust law, one of the factors that led to the deposition of Vargas, and extinguished the Council of People's Economy. Granted autonomy to the University of Brazil and regulated various departments of the Ministry of Transportation and Public Works. In December 1945 elections were held for the presidency and the National Constituent Assembly. José Linhares remained in office until the inauguration of the elected president, Eurico Gaspar Dutra.

References

External links

1886 births
1957 deaths
Presidents of Brazil
Members of the Federal Senate (Brazil)
Leaders who took power by coup
People from Baturité